Whittard of Chelsea is a British chain of shops selling coffee, tea and related products. It was started by Walter Whittard in 1886, and remained in his family until 1973. In 1996 it was floated on the Alternative Investment Market, and expanded rapidly, building a chain of about 120 shops and several tea rooms. It went bankrupt in 2008; more than fifty of the shops were closed, and the company was restructured into private equity ownership.  The chain has more than fifty shops in the United Kingdom, and one in Taiwan.

History 

The company was started by Walter Whittard, who opened a tea shop in Fleet Street in 1886, and remained in his family until 1973. In 1996 it was floated on the Alternative Investment Market, and used some of the proceeds of the float to expand rapidly, building a chain of about 120 shops and several tea rooms. It made heavy losses in an attempt to establish an internet sales business, which was closed down in about 2001. After further financial difficulties, it was sold to the Baugur Group, an Icelandic investment company, in 2005 for about £21 million. In the year to the end of March 2007, Whittard reported a loss of £3.2 million. Baugur went bankrupt in the Icelandic financial crisis of 2008, and Whittards also went into receivership. It was sold to Epic Private Equity for £600,000. More than fifty of the shops were closed, and the company was restructured.

In 2016 Whittard opened a tea-bar in its Covent Garden shop.

References 

Drink companies of England
Retail companies established in 1886
Companies based in Oxfordshire
1886 establishments in England
Companies that have entered administration in the United Kingdom